The Trammell Bridge is  long and carries State Road 20 over the Apalachicola River in the Florida Panhandle between Blountstown and Bristol. It is named for three members of the Trammell family: (1) U.S. Senator from Florida and former governor Park M. Trammell, who died in office in 1936; (2) his brother, John D. Trammell, member of the Florida legislature representing Calhoun County (Blountstown) who introduced the bill to construct the original bridge; and (3) Robert D. Trammell, John Trammell's grandson who represented the area in the Florida legislature and secured funding for the new bridge.

The westbound and eastbound lanes of SR 20 are on separate spans. The westbound span is the original, older bridge (opened in 1938) and the eastbound span is a modern, concrete high-rise bridge (opened in 1998).

The original bridge (westbound) was built of steel and concrete piers by the Wisconsin Iron and Bridge Company. In 1989, the original span was listed in A Guide to Florida's Historic Architecture, published by the University of Florida Press.

The Eastern end of the bridge is in the Eastern Time zone, while the Western end is in the Central Time zone.

See also
List of bridges documented by the Historic American Engineering Record in Florida

References

External links

Blountstown Bridge

Historic American Engineering Record in Florida
Transportation buildings and structures in Calhoun County, Florida
Road bridges in Florida
Bridges over the Apalachicola River
1938 establishments in Florida
Steel bridges in the United States
Concrete bridges in the United States
Transportation buildings and structures in Liberty County, Florida
Bridges completed in 1938
Bridges completed in 1998